Wait for Night is the fourth studio album by Australian singer-songwriter Rick Springfield, originally released by Chelsea Records in 1976. The album was reissued by RCA Records in 1982 (with an enclosed poster from his 1982 "Sweat For Success" tour and an alternate cover that added a handwritten note from Rick and colored paint strokes on the original cover's B&W photo), and that version managed to crack into the Billboard album charts. The album was reissued on CD in 2010 by Wounded Bird Records. Stylistically, the album represented a move away from Springfield's 1970s light rock sound to the trademark arena-ready power pop/pop rock sound that Springfield would later find success with throughout the 1980s. It received a mostly favorable review from Stephen Thomas Erlewine of AllMusic.

Most of the instruments were performed by Rick Springfield himself with exception to drums which has been accredited to Nigel Olsson, a former (and now, current) drummer of Elton John. The album's opener "Take a Hand"  would later be included in several 'best of' albums for Springfield, and it continues to a staple of Springfield's live performances.  Record World called "Take a Hand" a "really exceptional radio song," saying that "Building to a rousing chorus after the first verse, the song never lets up."

Track listing
All songs written by Rick Springfield.
 "Take a Hand" 2:16
 "Goldfever" 2:58
 "One Broken Heart" 2:54
 "Where's All the Love" 3:24
 "Archangel" 3:03
 "Jessica" 3:00
 "Million Dollar Face" 2:50
 "Old Gangsters Never Die" 3:06
 "Treat Me Gently in the Morning" 4:35
 "Life Is a Celebration" 3:04

Personnel
Rick Springfield - vocals, guitar, bass, piano, front cover design concept
Dee Murray, Joe Lamano - bass
Nigel Olsson - drums
Gabriel Katona, Jim Haas, Les Emmerson, Dee Murray - backing vocals
Jimmie Haskell - strings

References

1976 albums
Rick Springfield albums